Much Love is the debut album by British singer Shola Ama. It was released by Freakstreet and WEA on 1 September 1997 in the United Kingdom. Ama worked with songwriting collective D'Influence on the majority of the album, with Shaun LaBelle, Livio Harris, and Paul Waller providing additional production. Much Love was preceded by two top ten hit singles: a cover of "You Might Need Somebody", originally made famous by Randy Crawford, and follow-up "You're the One I Love". "Who's Loving My Baby" and "Much Love" were also released as singles, both reaching the UK top twenty.

The album reached the top ten of the UK Albums Chart, peaking at number six, and entered the top twenty in Germany and the top thirty in France, and the Netherlands. In the United Kingdom, it was eventually certified gold by the British Phonographic Industry (BPI), indicating sales in excess of 100,000 copies. Following the success of the album, Ama won a Brit Award for Best British Female and two MOBO Awards for Best Newcomer and Best R&B Act.

Track listing

Sample credits
 "I Love Your Ways" contains a replayed element of "Give Me the Sunshine" by Leo's Sunshipp.

Personnel
Adapted from AllMusic.

San Acharya – A&R
Shola Ama – primary artist, vocals, background vocals
Ed Baden-Powell – bass, drum programming, guitar, acoustic guitar, bass, keyboards, string arrangements
Toby Baker – bass, keyboards
David Barry – guitar
Carlton Batts – mastering
Joe Belmaati – keyboards, programming
Melvin Britt – background vocals
Sue Ann Carwell – vocal arrangement, background vocals
Rob Chiarelli – mixing
Jorge Corante – drum programming, keyboards, piano
Cutfather – producer, remixing
D'Influence – arranger, mixing, producer
Michael "Mickey D" Davis – A&R, executive producer
Terry Dexter – background vocals
Marcella Ffrench – background vocals
Mark Franks – engineer
Guido Zen – engineer
Livio Harris – arranger, producer, background vocals
Stephen Hussey – strings
Anthony Jeffries – engineer
Kwame Kwaten – bass, executive producer, keyboards, moog bass
Shaun LaBelle – arranger, bass, drum programming, producer, synthesizer
Ed Lover – engineer
Steve Marston – horn
Patrick McMahon – engineer
Yan Memmi – engineer, mixing
Rod Michaels – engineer
Randee Saint Nicholas – photography
Dik Shopteau – engineer
Paul Waller – arranger, drum programming, keyboards, mixing, producer

Charts

Certifications

References

External links
Much Love at Discogs

1997 debut albums
Warner Music Group albums
Shola Ama albums